is a Japanese ultramarathon and  marathon runner born in Osaka. He was the World Athletics male world record holder over the 100 km ultramarathon distance, with a time of 6:13:33 (Lake Saroma-Tokoro Japan June 21, 1998) until it was broken by Nao Kazami in 2018 with a time of 6:09:14. His personal best time for the marathon is 2:10:07 (Berlin, Germany September 10, 2000), where he finished in 4th place.

Achievements

References

External links
 

1973 births
Living people
Japanese male marathon runners
Japanese ultramarathon runners
Male ultramarathon runners